"Quando m'innamoro" is a 1968 Italian song written by Daniele Pace, Mario Panzeri and Roberto Livraghi and sung with a double performance by Anna Identici and by The Sandpipers  at the 1968 Sanremo Music Festival, in which it came 6th.

Recording in other languages
The song was adapted into French under the title "Comment te dire" and was recorded by Joe Dassin.
In English as A man without love and was recorded by Engelbert Humperdinck
In Spanish the song was sung as Cuando me enamoro 
In Japanese as Ai no hana saku toki (愛の花咲くとき), and 
In Estonian, the song has been performed by Uno Loop with lyrics by Kustas Kikerpuu, titled "Oled teinud mind õnnelikuks".
In Finnish, the song was first recorded by Fredi with lyrics by Juha Vainio, titled "Milloinkaan en löydä samanlaista". Later versions have been performed by Kari Tapio and Jamppa Tuominen.
In Swedish, the song has been sung as Sommaren det hände (The summer when it happened) by Anna-Lena Löfgren and as Före min tid (Before my time) by Knut Agnred as a part of the comedy musical Lyckad nedfrysning av herr Moro (Successful freezing of Mr Moro), performed 1994-95 by Galenskaparna and After Shave, with lyrics by Claes Eriksson.
In Russian as Верить в свою звезду (Believing to your star) by Юрий Охочинский.
In Portuguese as "Quando me enamoro" by Agnaldo Rayol, Agnaldo Timóteo and George Freedman; by Simone de Oliveira.
In 1969 Vico Torriani recorded a cover in German, inserted in the album Buona sera, Vico! (Good evening, Vico!) (Philips, 844 368 PY), released in Germany and Austria.

Other recordings
The song was also released 2005 from Patrizio Buanne in Italian and English on his album The Italian (album).  "Quando m'innamoro" has been covered by artists including Ray Conniff, Julio Iglesias, Lionel Hampton, Sergio Franchi, Emilio Pericoli, Gigliola Cinquetti and Andrea Bocelli.

Engelbert Humperdinck recording

The song's English lyrics were written by Barry Mason as "A Man Without Love".  The most popular version was recorded in 1968 by Engelbert Humperdinck, who in the UK hit #2 on the chart. In the US, the Humperdinck version went to #19 on the Hot 100 and #3 on the Easy Listening chart.  It was the title track of his third LP.

Chart history

Weekly charts

The Sandpipers (Italian version)

 Joe Dassin ("Comment te dire", French version)

Year-end charts

In popular culture
Humperdinck's version was used in the 2005 film Romance & Cigarettes. 
The song is featured in 2 episodes of the Marvel Cinematic Universe Disney+ series Moon Knight, the premiere The Goldfish Problem and the finale Gods and Monsters.

References

1968 songs
Sanremo Music Festival songs
Songs written by Mario Panzeri
Songs written by Daniele Pace
Joe Dassin songs
CBS Disques singles
Engelbert Humperdinck songs
Irish Singles Chart number-one singles
Number-one singles in Switzerland
1968 singles
Songs about loneliness
Gigliola Cinquetti songs
The Sandpipers songs